The Dancing Marquis is the eighteenth solo studio album by the British singer/songwriter Marc Almond. It was released by Strike Force Entertainment / Cherry Red Records on 16 June 2014.

Background

The Dancing Marquis compiles the songs from the limited edition 7" vinyl EPs Burn Bright and Tasmanian Tiger together with two new tracks and two remixes. The album features guest appearances from Jarvis Cocker and Carl Barât, and some of the tracks were produced by Tony Visconti.

The title track is named for Henry Paget, 5th Marquess of Anglesey according to Almond in an interview with author Tony O'Neill. The Marquess "haunts Almond's new album", which O'Neill calls "Marc's poppiest and most accessible work in years".

The song "Death of a Dandy" is a tribute to the London artist Sebastian Horsley who had died at the time and features a guest appearance from Danielz, who plays in the T-Rex tribute band T.Rextasy.

Jarvis Cocker wrote and produced "Worship Me Now" for Almond, although the pair had never met, and also "whispered" backing vocals for the track.

Almond had worked with Carl Barât before and asked for a song for the album, which Barât delivered in "Love Is Not on Trial", alongside vocal and guitar contributions.

Critical reception

The review at Louder Than War calls the album "more magic from a national treasure" commenting that "you never lose the knack of writing a good tune, and it's something that has never left Marc". The limited edition EP Tasmanian Tiger was reviewed separately by The Quietus who feel it is "another reason to treasure one of the music world's most inspired and restless mavericks". Thom Jurek at AllMusic calls The Dancing Marquis album "a glorious tease" and states that "there is a bit of everything here", from ballads, glam waltzes, pulsing synths, and modern pop.

Track listing

Personnel

Marc Almond – vocals
Neal Whitmore – guitar, keyboards, programming, synthesizer
Carl Holt – bass
Tim Weller – drums, percussion
Hugh Wilkinson – talking drum, extra percussion
Martin McCarrick – piano, cello, string arrangement
Tony Visconti – string arrangement
Kimberlee McCarrick – violin
Gini Ball – violin
Claire Orsler – viola
Martin Watkins – piano, Hammond organ
Katie Kresek – violin
Rachel Golub – violin
Entcho Todorov – violin
Jonathan Dinklage – violin
Ron Lawrence – viola
Julie Goodale – viola
Dave Eggar – cello
Peter Sachon – cello
Jason Buckle – keyboard programming
Clifford Slapper – piano
Justin Jones – orchestral guitar
Steve Nieve – Vox Continental, piano, keyboards
Roland Faber – drum programming, additional synthesizer
Lousie Marshall – backing vocals
Billy Godfrey – backing vocals
Kelly Barnes – backing vocals
Laura June Barnes – backing vocals
Mazz Murray – backing vocals
Annabell Williams – backing vocals

References

2014 albums
Marc Almond albums
Cherry Red Records albums
Albums produced by Tony Visconti